Corridonia is a comune (municipality) in the Province of Macerata in the Italian region Marche, located about  south of Ancona and about  southeast of Macerata.

Corridonia was called, until 1931, Pausula. The name was changed by Benito Mussolini to honor Filippo Corridoni,  interventionist syndicalist who died on 23 October 1915.

Corridonia borders the following municipalities: Francavilla d'Ete, Macerata, Mogliano, Monte San Giusto, Monte San Pietrangeli, Morrovalle, Petriolo, Tolentino, Urbisaglia.

People
Filippo Corridoni, syndicalist
Giovanni Battista Velluti, castrated  opera singer
Massimo Ciocci, football player
Luigi Lanzi,  antiquarian

References

Cities and towns in the Marche